Te Kohanga is a village and rural community in the Waikato District and Waikato region of New Zealand's North Island. It is part of the Onewhero statistical area, which is much larger than this community. The meshblock covering Te Kohanga had a population of 102 in the 2013 New Zealand census.

Marae
The community has two marae with Waikato Tainui hapū. Tikirahi Marae is affiliated with the hapū of Ngāti Tiipa. Te Kotahitanga Marae is associated with the hapū of Ngāti Āmaru, Ngāti Apakura and Ngāti Tiipa.

Education
Te Kohanga School is a coeducational primary (years 1-6) school with a roll of  students as of  The school celebrated its centenary in 2013.

References

External links 
Onewhero local directory

Waikato District
Populated places in Waikato
Populated places on the Waikato River